Campaign Chronicles is a non-fiction book series from Pen & Sword publishers that analyses pivotal battles in history and the men and armies that participated in them. The first book in the series was Napoleon's Polish Gamble: Eylau & Friedland (September 2005) by Christopher Summerville, who is also the series editor.

Titles
Armada 1588. John Barratt, 2005. 
Attack on the Somme. Martin Pegler, 2006. 
Caesar's Gallic Triumph. Peter Inker, 2008. 
Dunkirk and the Fall of France. Geoffrey Stewart, 2008. 
Napoleon's Polish Gamble: Eylau & Friedland. Christopher Summerville, 2005. 
Passchendaele: The Hollow Victory. Martin Marix Evans, 2005. 
Poland Betrayed. David G. Williamson, 2009. 
Salerno 1943. Angus Konstam, 2007. 
Second Ypres 1915: The Gas Attack. John Lee, 2009. 
The Battle of Borodino: Napoleon Against Kutuzov. Alexander Mikaberidze, 2010. 
The German Offensives of 1918: The Last Desperate Gamble. Ian Passingham, 2008. 
The Siege of Malta 1940-42. David G Williamson, 2007. 
The Viking Wars of Alfred the Great. Paul Hill, 2008. 
Victory at Poitiers: The Black Prince and the Medieval Art of War. Christian Teutsch, 2010. 
War For The Throne: The Battle of Shrewsbury 1403. John Barratt, 2010.

References 

Series of history books
Books about military history